Charles John Colwell Orr Hastings (23 August 1858 in Markham Township, Canada – 17 January 1931 in Toronto) was an obstetrician and public health pioneer.

Biography
Dr. Hastings lost his daughter to typhoid because of contaminated milk.  At that time, Toronto also had no sewage treatment, and used unchlorinated water from Lake Ontario. In middle age, Hastings switched from a normal career in obstetrics to an outstanding one in public health.

As Toronto's Medical Officer of Health (1910–29) Hastings crusaded to make Toronto the first city in Canada to pasteurize milk. He introduced a safe water supply, eliminated privies, helped establish the public-health nursing system, medical and dental inspection in public schools, neighborhood baby clinics, childhood immunizations, and health inspections for homes and restaurants. The improvements lowered Toronto's death rate from communicable diseases from 15.3 per 1000 in 1909 to 10.3 per 1000 in 1925. Hastings became president of the Canadian Public Health Association in 1916 and the American Public Health Association in 1918.

References

External links 
The Canadian Encyclopedia – Hastings, Charles John Colwell Orr
Archives of Ontario -- Includes a newspaper cartoon on the efforts of Dr. Hastings cleaning up Toronto
Biographical Article on Dr. Hastings and his work in Toronto

People from Markham, Ontario
1858 births
1931 deaths
Canadian public health doctors